This is a list of the largest onshore wind farms that are currently operational, rated by generating capacity. Also listed are onshore wind farms with notability other than size, and largest proposed projects.

Largest operational onshore wind farms 

Many of these wind farms have been built in stages, and construction of a further stage may be continuing at some of these sites.

Large proposed wind farms 

The following table lists some of the largest proposed onshore wind farms, by nameplate capacity.

Maps of all the coordinates in this article 

Note that the Google map allows the display of the coordinates listed in the individual sections of the article to be turned on and off (use the expand(+) / contract(-) icons and the checkboxes to control which sections, or individual coordinate flags, are displayed).

See also 

 List of energy storage power plants
 List of offshore wind farms
 Wind power by country

References 

Wind farms (Onshore)
onshore
Lists related to renewable energy
Renewable energy commercialization